Is That You, Herb? is a short story by author Ray Bradbury.  A chapbook edition of it was published by Gauntlet Press in 2003.

References

External links
 
 
 

2003 short stories
2003 books
Fantasy short stories
Short stories by Ray Bradbury